Lawrence Wells Steers (February 14, 1888 – February 15, 1951) was an American film actor.  He appeared in more than 550 films between 1917 and 1951. He was born in Indiana, and died in Woodland Hills, Los Angeles.

Partial filmography

 Old Wives for New (1918)
 The City of Dim Faces (1918)
 A Pair of Silk Stockings (1918)
 Little Comrade (1919)
 Heartsease (1919)
 The Roaring Road (1919) (uncredited)
 The Right of Way (1920)
 Dollar for Dollar (1920)
 Wealth (1921)
 The Blot (1921) (uncredited)
 Elope If You Must (1922)
 Bell Boy 13 (1923) (uncredited)
 Mind Over Motor (1923)
 Soul of the Beast (1923)
 The Girl in the Limousine (1924)
 Ten Scars Make a Man (1924)
 A Cafe in Cairo (1924)
 Paint and Powder (1925)
 The Love Gamble (1925)
 Wild West (1925)
 New Brooms (1925)
 The Best People (1925)
 Flattery (1925)
 Lady Windermere's Fan (1925)
 Hearts and Spangles (1926)
 The Lodge in the Wilderness (1926)
 No Control (1927)
 The Phantom Flyer (1928)
 The Terrible People (1928)
 The Fire Detective (1929)
 In Old California  (1929)   	
 Dark Skies (1929)
 The Wheel of Life (1929)
 The King of the Kongo (1929)
 The Road to Reno (1931)
 Possessed (1931)
 Night World (1932)
 Cocktail Hour (1933)
 Transatlantic Merry-Go-Round (1934)
 The Great Hotel Murder (1935)
 The Great Impersonation (1935)
 The Invisible Killer (1939)
 Wonder Man (1945)
 The Private Affairs of Bel Ami (1947)

References

External links

1888 births
1951 deaths
American male film actors
American male silent film actors
Male actors from Indiana
20th-century American male actors